Events in bold are majors.

Hana Bank-KOLON Championship is co-sanctioned with LPGA.
Daishin Securities-Tomato Tour Korean Ladies Masters is co-sanctioned with Ladies European Tour.

LPGA of Korea Tour
KLPGA Tour